Quebecair Flight 255 was a scheduled flight from Quebec City to Montreal. On March 29, 1979, the Fairchild F-27, registered CF-QBL, that was operating the flight crashed minutes after takeoff when an engine exploded. All three crew and 14 of the 21 passengers died.

Crash
Following takeoff from Jean Lesage International Airport, the flight crew advised the control tower of a problem with their right engine. The plane was given clearance for an emergency landing. It circled the airport twice with flames emanating from one engine. The plane began the final turn in its landing sequence before crashing into a hillside. "I heard a loud explosion and rushed out and saw the plane in flames" one witness said.

Firemen arrived at the scene within minutes, but it was reported they were "unable to approach the burning wreckage for some time because of the extreme heat." Ambulances had difficulty reaching the accident site because they had to cross a railway line. "Most of the people were not dead. Several died during the first half-hour after the accident. There were limbs cut off. We had to be careful when we were moving them," one woman told journalists.

Investigation
The flight data recorders were recovered soon after the crash. Canadian investigators concluded that shortly after the twin-turboprop airliner lifted off, the low pressure impeller from the no. 2 engine burst, causing the forward part of the engine to separate. The flight crew were unable to raise the landing gear because debris from the engine damaged the electronic gear selection circuitry. This, together with the exposed engine, increased the aerodynamic drag dramatically, and the aircraft was unable to climb or maintain altitude during its final turn. The center of gravity shifted beyond its aft limit due to the engine separation and passenger movement, causing the airspeed to drop below the minimum control speed shortly before the aircraft struck the hillside.

References

Aviation accidents and incidents in 1979
Airliner accidents and incidents in Canada
Quebecair accidents and incidents
Accidents and incidents involving the Fairchild F-27
March 1979 events in Canada
1979 in Quebec